The 1970 Stanley Cup Finals was the championship series of the National Hockey League's (NHL) 1969–70 season, and the culmination of the 1970 Stanley Cup playoffs.
It was a contest between the Boston Bruins and the St. Louis Blues, who appeared in their third consecutive finals series. The Bruins were making their first appearance in the Stanley Cup Finals since .

The Bruins won the series, four games to none. It was Boston's first Stanley Cup victory in 29 years. Bobby Orr scored the Cup-winning goal on Mother's Day against St. Louis' veteran Hall of Fame goalie Glenn Hall, with an assist from close friend and teammate "The Turk" Derek Sanderson, at forty seconds of overtime. The subsequent image of Orr flying through the air, his arms stretched out in victory — (he had been tripped by Blues' defenseman Noel Picard immediately after scoring the goal) — is considered the most famous and recognized hockey image of all time. The Blues, who had gone to the Finals their first three years in the league, would eventually lose each of the three series in four-game sweeps. St. Louis would not appear in a Stanley Cup Finals again until 2019, where they also faced the Bruins, ending the second-longest Finals drought in league history.

Paths to the Finals
Boston defeated the New York Rangers 4–2 and the Chicago Black Hawks 4–0 to advance to the Finals.

St. Louis defeated the Minnesota North Stars 4–2 and the Pittsburgh Penguins 4–2.

Game summaries
The Boston Bruins tied for first in the East Division with the Chicago Black Hawks with 99 points. The Bruins lost the tiebreaker of wins with 40 to Chicago's 45. The St. Louis Blues finished first in the West Division with 86 points. This was the first playoff meeting between these two teams. In this year's regular-season series, there were three wins for Boston, one for St. Louis and two ties.

At 3:57 of the second period of game one, a hard shot from Fred Stanfield was deflected and struck Jacques Plante in the forehead of his face mask, splitting the mask in half and injuring Plante.  Plante was finished for the series. Doctors later said if he hadn't been wearing the mask, he surely would have been killed. Ernie Wakely took over in goal but only held off the Bruins for a few minutes before becoming a rather easy mark for Bruins sharpshooters.

Quotes

"The Flight"
The most commonly seen video clip of Bobby Orr's famous overtime goal ("The Flight") in game four is the American version broadcast on CBS as called by Dan Kelly. This archival clip can be considered a rarity, since surviving kinescopes or videotapes of the telecasts of hockey games from this era usually emanate from CBC's coverage. According to Dick Irvin Jr.'s book My 26 Stanley Cups (Irvin was in the CBC booth with Danny Gallivan during the 1970 Stanley Cup Finals), he was always curious why even the CBC typically uses the CBS replay of the Bobby Orr goal (with Dan Kelly's commentary) instead of Gallivan's call. The explanation that Irvin received was that the CBC's master tape of the game (along with others) was thrown away in order to clear shelf space at the network.

The New England Sports Network has played the CBS video of the goal but has used the original WBZ-FM radio call with Fred Cusick and Johnny Peirson.

Stanley Cup engraving
The 1970 Stanley Cup was presented to Bruins alternate captain Johnny Bucyk by NHL President Clarence Campbell following the Bruins 4–3 overtime win over the Blues in game four.

The following Bruins players and staff had their names engraved on the Stanley Cup

1969–70 Boston Bruins

Stanley Cup engravings 
 Tom Johnson's name was engraved T. Johnson TR by mistake. Johnson was actually the assistant manager, not the trainer. The mistake was not corrected on the Replica Stanley Cup created in 1992–93.
 Ted Green received a head injury in a pre-season game.  He missed the entire season, but his name was still engraved on the Stanley Cup. John Adams (goal) and Ivan Boldirev (forward) had their names engraved on the Cup before they played their first NHL game. Boldirev played his first NHL game for Boston during 1970–71 season, Adams played his first NHL game for Boston during the 1972–73 season. Dan Schock played in the minors but was called up to play one playoff game, earning a spot on the Stanley Cup.  Ron Murphy played only 20 regular-season games and had officially retired in March, but his name was engraved on the Cup.
 Boston Bruins did not have an official Captain – John Bucyk, Phil Esposito, Ed Westfall were Alternate Captains. Bucyk was presented with the Cup because he was the most senior letter-wearer (a scenario that would repeat in 1972).
After Boston included 3 players who did not play for the team that season, the NHL only allowed players who dressed in the playoffs to be included on the Stanley Cup.
 The NHL feared that the Original Stanley Cup bowl was becoming too brittle. So a new Presentation Stanley Cup was made and first awarded in 1970. It was identical to the original bowl. The Original bowl was retired and put on permanent display at the Hockey Hall Fame.

See also
 1969–70 NHL season

References

Further reading
 

Stanley Cup
Stanley Cup Finals
Boston Bruins games
St. Louis Blues games
Ice hockey competitions in St. Louis
Ice hockey competitions in Boston
Stanley Cup Finals
Stanley Cup Finals
1970s in St. Louis
Stanley Cup Finals
Stanley Cup Finals
Boston Garden